Ander Gago Álvarez (born 10 September 1984 in Galdakao, Biscay, Basque Country) is a Spanish former professional footballer who played as a right back.

External links

1984 births
Living people
People from Galdakao
Sportspeople from Biscay
Spanish footballers
Footballers from the Basque Country (autonomous community)
Association football defenders
Segunda División players
Segunda División B players
Tercera División players
CD Basconia footballers
Bilbao Athletic footballers
Athletic Bilbao footballers
Real Jaén footballers
SD Lemona footballers
Real Murcia players
CD Guadalajara (Spain) footballers
CD Atlético Baleares footballers
CD Guijuelo footballers
UD Logroñés players
Sestao River footballers